Jubilant Power is an album by American trumpeter Ted Curson which has one side recorded live in Philadelphia and the other recorded in a New York studio the following day which was first released on the Inner City label in 1976.

Reception

Allmusic awarded the album 4 stars noting "Ted Curson's Jubilant Power shows the modern jazz trumpeter in prime condition, very influenced by a stint with Charles Mingus, and exhorting his large ensemble to play music indicative of the title... Because Ted Curson produced far too few recordings, and because the band is excellent, this has to rank as one of his best efforts, his modern jazz still sounding vital and fresh".

Track listing
All compositions by Ted Curson
 "Reava's Waltz" - 12:00
 "Ted's Tempo" - 9:00
 "Song of the Lonely" - 7:40
 "Airi's Tune" - 6:23
 "Searchin' for the Blues" - 6:42
 "Marjo" - 5:45

Personnel
Ted Curson - trumpet, flugelhorn, piccolo trumpet, cowbells
Chris Woods - flute, alto saxophone
Nick Brignola - baritone saxophone, saxello
Andy LaVerne (tracks 1 & 2), Jim McNeely (tracks 3-6) - piano
David Friesen - bass
Steve McCall (tracks 1 & 2), Bob Merigliano (tracks 3-6) - drums
Sam Jacobs - congas

References

1976 albums
Inner City Records albums
Ted Curson albums